The 1880 Cincinnati Stars season was the first and only season for the Cincinnati Stars, a professional baseball franchise competing in the National League (NL). The club replaced the defunct Cincinnati Reds that had competed in the NL during 1876–1879. The Stars finished last in the eight-team NL with a record of 21–59, 44 games behind the Chicago White Stockings.

Team president Justus Thorner resigned in early July, with vice-president Nathan Menderson selected as his successor. At the end of the season, the team was kicked out of the league for their refusal to stop selling beer and renting out their park on Sundays. A new Cincinnati Reds franchise joined the American Association two years later.

Regular season
During the off-season, Cincinnati signed catcher John Clapp, who had played with the Buffalo Bisons in the previous season. Clapp was also named the manager of the team. Deacon White, who was the Reds catcher in 1878 and 1879, moved to the outfield. Other off-season signings included Hick Carpenter of the Syracuse Stars to play third base, while the Stars had rookies at first base, John Reilly, and second base, Pop Smith.

Clapp and Blondie Purcell led the team offensively, as Clapp had a .282 average with a homer and 20 RBI and 33 runs scored, while Purcell hit .292 with a homer and 24 RBI, along with 48 runs. Will White led the NL with 42 losses; however, he had a good ERA of 2.14.

Cincinnati got off to a miserable start, having a record of only 6–26 in their first 32 games, which included lopsided losses of 20–7 and 15–1 to the White Stockings, and 13–0 to the Worcester Worcesters during that span. Cincinnati never got it together during the season, and finished in last place in their only season, 44 games behind the first place White Stockings.

Season standings

Record vs. opponents

Roster

Player stats

Batting

Starters by position
Note: Pos = Position; G = Games played; AB = At bats; H = Hits; Avg. = Batting average; HR = Home runs; RBI = Runs batted in

Other batters
Note: G = Games played; AB = At bats; H = Hits; Avg. = Batting average; HR = Home runs; RBI = Runs batted in

Pitching

Starting pitchers
Note: G = Games pitched; IP = Innings pitched; W = Wins; L = Losses; ERA = Earned run average; SO = Strikeouts

References

1880 Cincinnati Reds at Baseball Reference.com
Retrosheet

Cincinnati Stars season
Cincinnati